Ignác Viktorin Raab (5 September 1715 – 2 February 1787) was a Czech painter and Jesuit brother. He is considered one of the most important Czech painters of the 18th century.

In his work can be traced the influence of Italian and Czech masters, such as Petr Brandl among others. His work is generally assigned to Rococo, but some remnants of the Baroque are still evident. Raab usually signed his works, because he considered this to be a right given to an author by God, who was the originator of his talent.

He was the author of a wide range of paintings and frescoes in various churches, monasteries and other religious buildings, including the altarpieces of the Churches of St. Ignatius and St. Nicholas in Prague. He is also listed as the author of the altarpieces in churches in Opava, Holy Trinity Church in Fulnek, and many others. Another two of his paintings, of Saints Odile and Thecla, are located on the side altars in the Church of St. Procopius in Letinech.

Biography
Raab was born in 1715 in Nechanice near Nový Bydžov, the 12th child of his family. Considering him to have a great talent for painting as a child, his father František decided to send him to Jičín to study art under painter Jan Jiří Major, a disciple of painter Petr Brandl. He studied with him for seven years.

In 1744, at the age of 29, he entered the novitiate of the Society of Jesus. After two years as a brother novice in Brno, he was sent to Jesuit houses in Klatovy, Uherské Hradiště, University of Olomouc, Jihlava, Kutná Hora, and to Prague. There he was at St. Clement and later the college of St. Ignatius in the New Town. He was then sent to Opava. In his service at these sites, he worked primarily as a skilled hand painter. In addition, he also performed various other supporting roles, such as table service (involving the preparation of meals for a common dining room) and care of elderly Jesuit companions. During this period, Raab produced a large number of images. His painting was involved in the decoration of a series of new churches, large-scale cycles of the lives of saints in corridors of Jesuit colleges, and to a lesser extent, frescos.

The longest period of his Jesuit life was spent at the Clementinum in Prague, where he lived from 1758 to 1769 and again in 1771. At the Clementinum he gradually created around him a painting workshop. In addition to paintings, Raab also produced drawings for works of sculpture, oversaw their implementation, and, if necessary, sculpted them himself. His Jesuit colleagues included the painter Josef Kramolín.

Raab's stay at the Clementinum was only interrupted in 1770, when he lived at the Church of St. Ignatius in the New Town of Prague. Four altarpieces by Raab are still visible in St. Ignatius: St. Liborius, St. Francis Xavier (with a small painting of St. Thecla), St. Barbara, and St. Francis Borgia. Corridors of the adjacent dormitory buildings were originally decorated with three major life cycles of the Jesuit saints, namely St. Ignatius of Loyola (27 canvases; 24 of which are preserved at Bohosudov), St. Francis Xavier (29, of which 12 are preserved at Bohosudov) and St. John Francis Regis (21, all of which are now lost). Associated with these are a series of ten paintings in the refectory, which represent scenes from the Old and New Testaments relating to food (four remain the property of the Vyšehrad Chapter). He also produced series of St. Aloysius Gonzaga (21, still preserved in Štěkeň) and St. Stanislaus Kostka (26, preserved in Štěkeň) which were done at the Clementinum. These 137 images of the saints (92 of them hanging in the New Church of St. Ignatius and adjacent buildings), each of approximately 2.2 x 2 meters, and mostly of high quality, were completed in about three years, between 1769-71. Raab was sometimes assisted in this work by his workshop, but the quality of many of them indicates that they were created by Raab alone.

In 1773, the Jesuit Order was abolished and Raab had to adapt to a new life. He was eventually accepted by the Cistercian monks of Velehrad. The quality of his work gradually declined, with the light virtuosity of the Rococo style replaced with Classical elements.

In 1784, the Velehrad Monastery met the fate of many other religious houses in the Habsburg empire, and was abolished. However, Raab opted to stay, and spent the rest of his life in Velehrad, earning a livelihood from his artistic work. He died in 1787.

References

External links
 Extended biography at www.jesuit.cz 

1715 births
1787 deaths
Czech Jesuits
Czech painters
Czech male painters
Catholic painters
People from Nechanice